David Trummer (born 1 June 1994) is an Austrian downhill mountain biker. In 2020, he finished second to British rider Reece Wilson in the UCI Downhill World Championships in Leogang, Austria.

Major results
2015
 1st  National Downhill Championships
2018
 1st  National Downhill Championships
2019
 1st  National Downhill Championships
 3rd  European Downhill Championships
2020
 1st  National Downhill Championships
 2nd  Downhill, UCI Mountain Bike World Championships

References

Living people
Downhill mountain bikers
1994 births
Austrian male cyclists
Austrian mountain bikers